Speiredonia spectans, the granny's cloak moth, is a moth of the family Erebidae. The species was first described by Achille Guenée in 1852. It is found in north-eastern Australia and Tasmania. Strays have been recorded on Norfolk Island and in New Zealand.

The wingspan is about 70 mm.

The larvae feed on Acacia species.

Gallery

References

Moths of Australia
Moths of New Zealand
Moths described in 1852
Speiredonia